Gnaeus (or Cneius, Cnaeus) Claudius Severus may refer to these following Romans:
Gnaeus Claudius Severus Arabianus, consul in 146
Gnaeus Claudius Severus (consul 167), son of Arabianus, consul in 167 and 173
Gnaeus Claudius Severus (consul 235), consul in 235